Eremiascincus butlerorum  is a species of skink, a lizard in the family Scincidae. The species is endemic to the island of Sumba in Indonesia.

Etymology
The specific name, butlerorum (Latin, genitive plural), is in honor of Australian naturalist William Henry "Harry" Butler and his wife Margaret Butler.

Habitat
The preferred natural habitat of E. butlerorum is forest, but the species has also been found in gardens.

Reroduction
E. butlerorum is oviparous.

References

Further reading
Aplin KP, How RA, Boeadi [sic] (1993). "A new species of the Glaphyromorphus isolepis Species Group (Lacertilia; Scincidae) from Sumba Island, Indonesia". Records of the Western Australian Museum 16 (2): 235–242. (Glaphyromorphus butlerorum, new species).
Mecke S, Doughty P, Donnellan SC (2009). "A new species of Eremiascincus (Reptilia: Squamata: Scincidae) from the Great Sandy Desert and Pilbara Coast, Western Australia and reassignment of eight species from Glaphyromorphus to Eremiascincus ". Zootaxa 2246: 1–20. (Eremiascincus butlerorum, new combination, p. 8). (in English, with an abstract in German).
Mecke, Sven; Kieckbusch, Max; Graf, Theresa; Beck, Lothar A.; O'Shea, Mark; Kaiser, Hinrich (2016). "First captive breeding of a night skink (Scincidae: Eremiascincus) from Timor-Leste, Lesser Sunda Islands, with remarks on the reproductive biology of the genus" Salamandra 52 (2): 178–188. (in English, with an abstract in German).

Eremiascincus
Reptiles described in 1993
Taxa named by Kenneth Peter Aplin
Taxa named by Richard Alfred How